Jacqueline Enfield (born 19 September 1947) is a British former swimmer. She competed in the women's 200 metre breaststroke at the 1964 Summer Olympics.

She also represented England and won a silver medal in 220 yards breaststroke, at the 1962 British Empire and Commonwealth Games in Perth, Western Australia. She also competed in the 110 yards breaststroke at the Games.

References

External links
 

1947 births
Living people
British female swimmers
Olympic swimmers of Great Britain
Swimmers at the 1964 Summer Olympics
Sportspeople from Northampton
Swimmers at the 1962 British Empire and Commonwealth Games
Commonwealth Games medallists in swimming
Commonwealth Games silver medallists for England
20th-century British women
21st-century British women
Medallists at the 1962 British Empire and Commonwealth Games